Ittefaq Hospital is a private hospital Trust located near H Block Model Town, Lahore, Punjab, Pakistan. Hospital was established by the family members of the Sharif family.

Other facilities available in Ittefaq Hospital
Accident & Emergencies, Medicine & Allied Specialties, Clinical & Interventional Cardiology, Surgery & Allied Specialties, Orthopaedic & Traumatology, Gynae & Obstetrics, Paeds (Neonatology & Cardiology), Ophthalmology, Diagnostic Radiology & Imaging, Pathology Lab, Dentistry, Anaesthesiology, Physiotherapy, General OPDs.

References

External links secondary

Hospitals in Lahore
Model Town, Lahore